The Nigeria Renewable Energy Master Plan (REMP) is a policy being implemented by Nigeria's Federal Ministry of Environment that aims to increase the contribution of renewable energy to account for 10% of Nigerian total energy consumption by 2025. The Renewable Energy Masterplan for Nigeria was produced in 2006 with support
from the UNDP.

Description
The Renewable Energy Master Plan (REMP) articulates Nigeria’s vision and sets out a road map for increasing the role of renewable energy in achieving sustainable development. The policy primarily addresses Nigeria's need for increased electricity supply, improved grid reliability and security.

Targets of REMP
Targets for Renewable Energy Contribution to Electricity Generation (MW) in Nigeria

See also

 Energy in Nigeria

References 

Renewable energy
Renewable energy in Nigeria